Psydrax livida (green-twigs quar) is an Afrotropical shrub or small tree  in the family Rubiaceae. It occurs in eastern and southern Africa, including Burundi, Kenya, the DRC, Tanzania, Malawi, Mozambique, Zambia, Zimbabwe, Angola, Botswana, northern Namibia and northern South Africa. It is deciduous or evergreen, and its green branches have an opposite and horizontal arrangement.

Gallery

References

External links

World Checklist of Rubiaceae

livida
Trees of Africa
Flora of East Tropical Africa
Flora of South Tropical Africa
Flora of Southern Africa
Flora of West-Central Tropical Africa
Taxa named by Diane Mary Bridson
Taxa named by William Philip Hiern